Marisa Letícia Lula da Silva (née Casa; 7 April 1950 – 3 February 2017) was the wife of the 35th and 39th president of Brazil Luiz Inácio Lula da Silva, and First Lady of Brazil from 2003 to 2010. 

Lula's first wife, Maria de Lourdes da Silva, died in labour when Lula was in his twenties and Marisa's first spouse, Marcos Cláudio dos Santos, died in 1971. 

On 24 January 2017, Marisa Letícia suffered a stroke. She died ten days later on 3 February, at the age of 66 at Sírio-Libanês Hospital. President Michel Temer declared three days of official mourning. She was cremated the next day. Her ashes were interred in the Cemitério Jardim da Colina, in her native São Bernardo do Campo, São Paulo.

Awards and decorations
:
 Grand Cross of the Order of the Dannebrog (12 September 2007)
:
 Dame Grand Cross of the Order of Isabella the Catholic

Gallery

References

1950 births
2017 deaths
People from São Bernardo do Campo
First ladies of Brazil
Brazilian people of Italian descent
Brazilian expatriates in Spain
Workers' Party (Brazil) politicians
Luiz Inácio Lula da Silva
Recipients of the Order of Isabella the Catholic
Dames Grand Cross of the Order of Isabella the Catholic